Hardiker is a surname. Notable people with the surname include:

John Hardiker (born 1982), English footballer
Rasmus Hardiker (born 1985), English actor

See also
Hardaker